Personal War is an EP by French hardcore punk band Birds in Row. It was released on 30 October 2015 through Deathwish, Inc., simultaneously with their split album Birds in Row / WAITC. The songs on both releases were recorded in 2014 with producer Amaury Sauvé.

A music video for the track "Weary" was released on 20 September 2015. The band streamed the album online a day prior to its release.

Critical reception

Exclaim! critic Branan Ranjanathan praised the EP, describing it as "a tumultuous, brooding and visceral ride that places Birds In Row amongst artists those pushing melodic hardcore forward."

Track listing
 "Intro" — 2:10
 "Torches" — 2:49
 "O'Dear" — 2:49
 "Weary" — 1:43
 "Worried" — 2:04
 "Snakes" — 1:43
 "Marathon" — 4:15

Personnel
 Birds in Row – performance, composition
 Amaury Sauvé – production, mixing, recording

References

External links
 Personal War on Deathwish, Inc. official website

2015 EPs
Deathwish Inc. EPs
Melodic hardcore EPs
Hardcore punk EPs
Birds in Row albums